Martin is a town in Stephens and Franklin County counties in the U.S. state of Georgia. The population was 381 at the 2010 census, up from 311 in 2000.

History

Martin was incorporated in 1891. Its first settler, Henry C. Black, was the Air Line Railroad agent at its station (set up in 1877) at the junction of Red Hollow Road and the railroad. Henry Black built houses and established stores around the junction, which attracted other settlers. The Red Hollow Road was an important conduit for farm products from the mountain areas to Augusta and Savannah. The town was named for John Martin, a Rhode Island man who became governor of Georgia in 1782.

Geography
Martin is located in southeastern Stephens County at  (34.486662, -83.185656) A small portion extends south into Franklin County. It is bordered to the north by the town of Avalon. Georgia State Route 17 passes through Martin, leading northwest  to Toccoa and southeast  to Lavonia.

Demographics

As of the census of 2000, there were 311 people, 127 households, and 84 families residing in the town. The racial makeup of the town was 72.03% White, 26.37% African American, 0.96% Asian, 0.32% from other races, and 0.32% from two or more races. Hispanic or Latino of any race were 0.64% of the population.

There were 127 households, out of which 30.7% had children under the age of 18 living with them, 54.3% were married couples living together, 10.2% had a female householder with no husband present, and 33.1% were non-families. 28.3% of all households were made up of individuals, and 13.4% had someone living alone who was 65 years of age or older.  The average household size was 2.45 and the average family size was 3.05.

In the town, the population was spread out, with 25.7% under the age of 18, 9.3% from 18 to 24, 26.4% from 25 to 44, 26.0% from 45 to 64, and 12.5% who were 65 years of age or older.  The median age was 38 years. For every 100 females, there were 98.1 males.  For every 100 females age 18 and over, there were 86.3 males.

The median income for a household in the town was $29,000, and the median income for a family was $43,750. Males had a median income of $31,333 versus $19,191 for females. The per capita income for the town was $15,009.  About 3.4% of families and 10.6% of the population were below the poverty line, including 6.0% of those under age 18 and 41.9% of those age 65 or over.

Economy
As of September 2011, the town of Martin has a few Main Street business. A local "gently used" shop by the name of "The One Stop Baby Shop" is located at the caution light on Main Street. During the summer of 2011 an ice cream shop was opened up with a moving water wheel decoration. There is also an antique shop and a small plant nursery that is open seasonally.

Martin is the location of Shepherd's Hill Academy, a private therapeutic boarding school.

Events
Martin has an annual "Fall Festival". The festival is located in the main street of town, running approximately one quarter mile and occurs on the last Saturday of October of each year. The festival generally includes a live band, food vendors, local handmade crafts, and commercially made items.

Notable people
U.S. Congressman Phillip M. Landrum was from Martin.

References

External links

Towns in Franklin County, Georgia
Towns in Stephens County, Georgia
Towns in Georgia (U.S. state)
1891 establishments in Georgia (U.S. state)
Populated places established in 1891